
Michael Ion Bossley  is an Australian cetacean researcher and environmentalist.

Career
Bossley worked as a university lecturer, teaching environmental studies and marine biology for 30 years. In his early years, he advocated for several environmental groups in his spare time. 

Bossley established the Australian Dolphin Research Foundation, which was the precursor to the Adelaide branch of Whale and Dolphin Conservation (WDC) Australasia. He was WDC's Manager of Science and Education in Australasia until his retirement in June 2015, after 12 years of working with the organisation. 

He was also the first director of Greenpeace Australia and participated in anti-whaling and anti-nuclear weapons testing campaigns.  

His work led to the establishment of the Adelaide Dolphin Sanctuary in South Australia's Port River estuary in 2005, which is home to a combination of resident and visiting bottlenose dolphins.

Bossley served as an Australian delegate on the International Whaling Commission, on behalf of the Australian Government, for six years, and has made submissions to many submissions to governments. He has also made presentations at many international conferences. 

After retirement from the WDC, Bossley stayed on as a part-time consultant, devoting his time to the New Zealand dolphin campaign.

Bossley has also served as president of the Friends of Gulf St Vincent, and was made a life member in 2020.

Honours

2005: South Australian award for Australian of the Year for his work in dolphin research and conservation
2006: Member of the Order of Australia "for service to the protection of marine mammals as a biologist, academic and conservationist and through involvement with a range of organisations that aim to protect these species"

Publications
Bossley's 2022 book Whales, Dolphins and Me was published by Moonglow Publishing, and chronicles his life's work in marine conservation.

He is also author or co-author of several published scientific papers,  including:

References 

Living people
Australian environmentalists
Members of the Order of Australia
Year of birth missing (living people)